Mizu Ahmed (17 November 1953 – 27 March 2017) was a Bangladeshi actor and producer. He is mostly known for his villain role in the Bengali film industry. He won Bangladesh National Film Award for Best Supporting Actor for his role in the film Traash (1992).

Early life and background
Ahmed was born on 17 November 1953 in Khustia, Khulna Division. His birth name is Mizanur Rahman. During his childhood, he was very interested in the theatre. In the following years, he became involved in the local drama theatre group.

Film career
In 1978, Ahmed made his film debut with the film Trishna. A couple of years later, he established himself as a villain in the Dhallywood film industry. He was also producing film from his own banner Friends Movies. In 2008 he was in the movie Baba Amar Baba.

Death 
At the age of 63, Ahmed died on 27 March 2017 due to cardiac arrest.

Filmography

References

External links
 

1953 births
2017 deaths
People from Kushtia District
Bangladeshi male film actors
Best Supporting Actor National Film Award (Bangladesh) winners
People from Khulna